Croft Castle is a country house in the village of Croft, Herefordshire, England. Owned by the Croft family since 1085, the castle and estate passed out of their hands in the 18th century, before being repurchased by the family in 1923. In 1957 it was bequeathed to the National Trust. The castle is a Grade I listed building, and the estate is separately listed as Grade II*. The adjacent Church of St Michael is listed Grade I.

History
A building has been on the site from c.1085 when the estate was established by the Croft family. and it has from this time been the home of the Croft family and Croft baronets. The Croft family were closely linked to their neighbours the Mortimers of Wigmore and Ludlow. The Battle of Mortimer's Cross took place on Croft land nearby in 1461. It was the home of Sir John de Croft who married Janet, one of Owain Glyndŵr's daughters. In the 15th century, the Croft family adopted the Welsh Wyvern crest, a wounded black dragon, seen as an allusion to their Glyndwr heritage. The first member of the Croft family to have owned the estate was Bernard de Croft, who is mentioned in Domesday Book.

The Croft family suffered financially following the South Sea Bubble and in 1746, sold the estate to Richard Knight (1693–1765). Knight was the eldest son and heir of Richard Knight (1659-1745), of Downton Hall, in the parish of Downton on the Rock in Herefordshire, a wealthy ironmaster who operated the Bringewood Ironworks and founded a large fortune and family dynasty. He married Elizabeth Powell of Stanage Park in Radnorshire by whom he had a sole daughter Elizabeth Knight, who married Thomas Johnes (died 1780) of Llanfair Clydogau, MP for Radnorshire (1777–80). In the 1760s, Johnes remodelled the Castle in the Rococo-Gothic style to the designs of the Shrewsbury architect Thomas Farnolls Pritchard (d.1777),designer of the world's first iron bridge spanning the Severn near Coalbrookdale. Georgian sash windows replaced mullion windows. Pritchard designed the plasterwork ceilings, the gothic staircase and employed master craftsmen to undertake his designs for the chimneypieces.

Croft Castle was put up for sale in 1799 by Thomas Johnes. It was bought by Somerset Davies(c.1754–1817), MP for Ludlow, whose descendants, the Kevill-Davies, sold Croft back to Katherine, Lady Croft, in 1923.  The castle had undergone further alterations in 1913 to the designs of the architect Walter Sarel (1863–1941) who removed the central section of the eighteenth-century gothic entrance front replacing it with a battlemented porch and mullioned bay window above; the entrance hall was lined with oak panelling. Also removed were most of Pritchard's crenellations along the parapets. Walter Sarel redesigned the dining room. In 1937, the seventeenth-century service wing to the north-west was demolished to make the house more compact.

In 1957, Croft was threatened with demolition following the destruction of eighteen other great houses in the county; the destruction of country houses in 20th-century Britain was gathering pace across the country, and continued through the 1960s.  Diana Uhlman (née Croft), was determined that Croft would not suffer the same fate. An endowment was raised by some members of the family before the National Trust would agree to take on the house and remaining estate. The castle opened to the public in 1960 after Michael, Lord Croft, had acquired paintings and furniture for display in the showrooms and his sister Diana established and funded the Croft Trust. The house is still occupied by members of the family.

Family
Members of the Croft family include:
 Sir Richard Croft (1429/30-1509), royal official for Kings Edward IV, Edward V, Richard III, and Henry VII
 Thomas Croft (c.1435–1488), shipowner and patron of Atlantic exploration
 Sir James Croft (c.1518–1590), lord deputy of Ireland and leading conspirator in Wyatt's Rebellion. He was also Comptroller of Queen Elizabeth's household.
 Sir Herbert Croft (died 1629)
 Margaret Croft (died 1637), lady in waiting to Elizabeth Stuart, Queen of Bohemia.
 Herbert Croft (1603–1691), bishop of Hereford, chaplain to King Charles I and dean of the chapels Royal to Charles II
 William Croft (c.1678–1727), organist and composer
 Sir Herbert Croft (1751–1816), writer and lexicographer
 Sir Richard Croft (1762–1818), physician and man-midwife
 Sir James Herbert Croft (1907–1941), died on active service with No 1 Commando
 Sir Henry Page Croft (1881–1947), 1st Baron Croft, soldier and politician, Under-Secretary of State for War 1940–1945
 Michael Croft, 2nd Baron Croft (1916-1997), collector of modern art
 Bernard Page Croft, 3rd Baron Croft (born 1949)

Architecture and description
The present building dates from the 1660s during the time when Herbert Croft was Bishop of Hereford, replacing an earlier house some thirty yards to the west, which was excavated by Herefordshire County Archaeologist Prof. Keith Ray and volunteers in 2002. The manor house is a quadrangular stone structure around a central courtyard with round corner towers, and a square bay on the north elevation. Some stone mullion windows remain on all elevations. The castle is one of the first examples of medieval revival, and has affinities to Ruperra Castle, Caerphilly, and Lulworth Castle, Wareham, Dorset.

Listing designations
Croft Castle is a Grade I listed building. The stable block,
 and two stretches of walling, are listed at Grade II. Three estate buildings also have Grade II listings, the Gothic Pumphouse, Croft Lodge, and Cock Gate Cottage. The Church of St Michael is listed Grade I. The garden and parkland surrounding the castle have their own Grade II* listing.

Garden and parkland
The property has a three-acre walled garden. It also has a Georgian stable block. The estate has an avenue of Spanish Chestnut trees which were planted over four hundred years ago. Beech and oak trees line the main drive. The Fishpool Valley was landscaped in the eighteenth century with descending ponds, a grotto, gothic pumphouse, an ice house and a lime kiln, and has undergone major restoration to bring it back to its scenic origins.

Church of St Michael
The Church of St Michael dates from around the 14th century. The box pews are seventeenth-century and there are some medieval floor tiles made at Malvern. and the fine tomb for Sir Richard and Eleanor Croft bears a resemblance to that of Henry VII in Westminster Abbey. The ceiling above the altar is seventeenth-century and is painted with clouds and gilded stars.

Hill fort

The parkland includes an Iron Age hill fort known as Croft Ambrey.

Location
It is surrounded by 1,500 acres of woodland, farmland and parkland. The Mortimer Trail, a long-distance footpath, passes by.

Gallery

See also
 Knight v Knight (1840) 3 Beav 148

Notes, references and sources

Notes

References

Sources

External links

 National Trust Croft Castle site
 Wikidata List of paintings at Croft Castle

Country houses in Herefordshire
National Trust properties in Herefordshire
Grade I listed buildings in Herefordshire
Buildings and structures in Leominster
Historic house museums in Herefordshire